The 2014–15 BYU Cougars women's basketball team represented Brigham Young University during the 2014–15 college basketball season. It was head coach Jeff Judkins' fourteenth season at BYU. The Cougars, members of the West Coast Conference, played their home games at the Marriott Center. They finished the season 22–10, 12–6 in WCC play to finish in fifth place. They Cougars won the WCC Tournament and earned an automatic trip to the NCAA women's tournament where they lost to Louisville in the first round.

Before the season

Departures

Recruiting

2013-14 Class
The 2013-14 recruiting class information will be posted as soon as it becomes available.

Future Classes

2014–15 media

BYU Radio Sports Network Affiliates

All Lady Cougar games that don't conflict with men's basketball or football games will be featured live on BYU Radio, found nationwide on Dish Network 980, on Sirius XM 143, and online at www.byuradio.org. Home games will be a BYUtv simulcast while road games will be voiced by Robbie Bullough. Select home games and road games will air on TheW.tv.

Roster

Schedule

|-
!colspan=8 style="background:#002654; color:#FFFFFF;"|Exhibition

|-
!colspan=8 style="background:#002654; color:white;"| Regular Season

|-
!colspan=8 style="background:#002654;"| 2015 WCC Tournament

|-
!colspan=8 style="background:#002654;"| 2015 NCAA Tournament

All BYUtv games were simulcast on BYU Radio with the BYUtv announcers, listed below. Select other games, listed with an x and y, were also broadcast on BYU Radio. 
y- BYU Radio road broadcasts w/ Robbie Bullough.
z- Non-BYUtv BYU Radio broadcast w/ Dave McCann & Blaine Fowler.

Game Summaries

Westminster
Broadcasters: Robbie Bullough & Keilani Unga
Starting Lineups:
Westminster: Shelby Ellsworth, Amy Krommenhoek, Tia Pappas, Amanda Hacking, Alli Winters
BYU: Ashley Garfield, Kylie Maeda, Lexi Eaton, Makenzi Morrison, Morgan Bailey

Ft. Lewis
Broadcasters: Robbie Bullough & Keilani Unga
Starting Lineups:
Ft. Lewis: Simone Ruedin, Kaile Magazzeni, Kate Bayes, Emily McCue, Kylie Santos
BYU: Ashley Garfield, Kylie Maeda, Lexi Eaton, Makenzi Morrison, Morgan Bailey

South Dakota State
Series History: BYU leads series 1-0
Starting Lineups:
BYU: Ashley Garfield, Kylie Maeda, Lexi Eaton, Makenzi Morrison, Morgan Bailey
South Dakota State: Chynna Stevens, Kerri Young, Macy Miller, Megan Wayatashek, Mariah Clarin

Cal State Northridge
Broadcasters: Spencer Linton & Kristen Kozlowski
Series History: BYU leads 4-0
Starting Lineups:
CSUN: Janae Sharp, Camille Mahlknecht, Ashlee Guay, Cinnamon Lister, Randi Friess
BYU: Ashley Garfield, Kylie Maeda, Lexi Eaton, Makenzi Morrison, Morgan Bailey

Nevada
Broadcasters: Spencer Linton & Kristen Kozlowski
Series History: BYU leads series 7-1
Starting Lineups:
Nevada: Terilyn Moe, Kelsey Kaelin, Nyasha Lesure, Emily Burns, Mimi Mungedi
BYU: Ashley Garfield, Kylie Maeda, Lexi Eaton, Makenzi Morrison, Morgan Bailey

Butler
Series History: First Meeting
Starting Lineups:
Butler: Ijeoma Uchendu, Blaire Langlois, Sydney Buck, Lexus Murry, Laryn Goodwin
BYU: Ashley Garfield, Kylie Maeda, Lexi Eaton, Makenzi Morrison, Morgan Bailey

BYU-Hawaii
Broadcaster: Landon Southwick
Series History: BYU leads 2-0
Starting Lineups:
BYU: Ashley Garfield, Kylie Maeda, Lexi Eaton, Makenzi Morrison, Morgan Bailey
BYU-Hawaii: Celeste Claw, Bry Tatupu-Leopoldo, Marquessa Gilson, Emily Nelson, Whitney Fieldsted

Oregon State
Series History: Oregon State leads series 5-4
Starting Lineups:
Oregon State: Ali Gibson, Jamie Weisner, Sydney Weise, Deven Hunter, Ruth Hamblin
BYU: Ashley Garfield, Kylie Maeda, Lexi Eaton, Makenzi Morrison, Morgan Bailey

UNLV
Broadcasters: Dave McCann & Kristen Kozlowski
Series History: BYU leads series 28-12
Starting Lineups:
UNLV: Nikki Wheatley, Aley Rohde, Diamond Major, Alana Cesarz, Danielle Miller
BYU: Ashley Garfield, Kylie Maeda, Lexi Eaton, Makenzi Morrison, Morgan Bailey

Colorado State
Broadcasters: Spencer Linton & Blaine Fowler
Series History: BYU leads series 53-22
Starting Lineups:
Colorado State: Gritt Ryder, Ellen Nystrom, Emilie Hesseldal, Elin Gustavsson, Keyora Wharry
BYU: Ashley Garfield, Kylie Maeda, Lexi Eaton, Makenzi Morrison, Morgan Bailey

Weber State
Broadcasters: Spencer Linton & Kristen Kozlowski
Series History: BYU leads series 41-9
Starting Lineups:
Weber State: Jalen Carpenter, Kailie Quinn, Zakiyyah Shahid-Martin, Brittney Dunbar, Regina Okoye
BYU: Ashley Garfield, Kylie Maeda, Lexi Eaton, Makenzi Morrison, Morgan Bailey

Utah
Broadcasters: Anne Marie Anderson & Mary Murphy
Series History: Utah leads series 62-40
Starting Lineups:
BYU: Ashley Garfield, Kylie Maeda, Lexi Eaton, Makenzi Morrison, Morgan Bailey
Utah: Taryn Wicijowski, Paige Crozon, Danielle Rodriguez, Tanaeya Boclair, Joeseta Fatuesi

Utah State
Broadcaster: Craig Hislop
Series History: BYU leads series 32-3
Starting Lineups:
BYU: Ashley Garfield, Kylie Maeda, Lexi Eaton, Makenzi Morrison, Morgan Bailey
Utah State: Elise Nelson, Funda Nakkasoglu, Tilar Clark, Hannah Hutchins, Franny Vaaulu

Gonzaga
Broadcasters: Greg Heister & Michelle Clark
Series History: Gonzaga leads series 9-6
Starting Lineups:
BYU: Ashley Garfield, Kylie Maeda, Lexi Eaton, Makenzi Morrison, Morgan Bailey
Gonzaga: Georgia Stirton, Sunny Greinacher, Keani Albanez, Elle Tinkle, Shleby Cheslek

Portland
Broadcaster: Cody Barton & Lindsay Gregg
Series History: BYU leads series 14-4
Starting Lineups:
BYU: Ashley Garfield, Kylie Maeda, Lexi Eaton, Makenzi Morrison, Morgan Bailey
Portland: Cassandra Brown, Kari Luttinen, Cassandra Thompson, Jasmine Wooton, Sara Zaragoza

Santa Clara
Broadcasters: Spencer Linton & Kristen Kozlowski
Series History: BYU leads series 8-1
Starting Lineups:
Santa Clara: Beth Carlson, Nici Gilday, Marie Bertholdt, Raquel Avila, Brooke Galloway
BYU: Ashley Garfield, Kylie Maeda, Lexi Eaton, Makenzi Morrison, Morgan Bailey

San Francisco
Broadcaster: Spencer Linton & Kristen Kozlowski
Series History: BYU leads series 10-2
Starting Lineups:
San Francisco: Zhane Dikes, Taj Winston, Paige Spietz, Rachel Howard, Taylor Proctor
BYU: Ashley Garfield, Kylie Maeda, Lexi Eaton, Makenzi Morrison, Morgan Bailey

Loyola Marymount
Broadcasters: Derek Georgino
Series History: BYU leads series 8-1
Starting Lineups:
BYU: Ashley Garfield, Kylie Maeda, Lexi Eaton, Makenzi Morrison, Morgan Bailey
LMU: Emily Ben-Jumbo, Sophie Taylor, Taylor Anderson, Leslie Lopez-Wood, Makenzie Cast

Pepperdine
Broadcaster: Josh Perigo
Series History: BYU leads series 8-2
Starting Lineups:
BYU: Xojian Harry, Kylie Maeda, Lexi Eaton, Makenzi Morrison, Morgan Bailey
Pepperdine: Bria Richardson, Ea Shoushtari, Krista Pettepier, Olivia Ogwumike, Keitra Wallace

Pacific
Broadcasters: Spencer Linton, Kristen Kozlowski, & Andy Boyce
Series History: BYU leads series 7-2
Starting Lineups:
Pacific: Kristina Johnson, Kendall Kenyon, Madison Parrish, Unique Coleman, Hailie Eackles
BYU: Xojian Harry, Kylie Maeda, Lexi Eaton, Makenzi Morrison, Morgan Bailey

Saint Mary's
Broadcaster: Dave McCann, Kristen Kozlowski, & Andy Boyce
Series History: BYU leads series 4-3
Starting Lineups:
Saint Mary's: Lauren Nicholson, Hayley Hendricksen, Shannon Mauldin, Stella Beck, Carli Rosenthal
BYU: Xojian Harry, Kylie Maeda, Lexi Eaton, Makenzi Morrison, Morgan Bailey

San Diego
Broadcasters: Dave McCann, Kristen Kozlowski, & Andy Boyce
Series History: BYU leads series 7-1
Starting Lineups:
San Diego: Malina Hood, Katelyn McDaniel, Sophia Ederaine, Maya Hood, Cori Woodward
BYU: Xojian Harry, Kylie Maeda, Lexi Eaton, Makenzi Morrison, Morgan Bailey

San Francisco
Broadcaster: George Devine
Series History: BYU leads series 11-2
Starting Lineups:
BYU: Xojian Harry, Kylie Maeda, Lexi Eaton, Makenzi Morrison, Morgan Bailey
San Francisco: Zhane Dikes, Taj Winston, Paige Spietz, Aundrea Gordon, Taylor Proctor

Santa Clara
Series History: BYU leads series 9-1
Starting Lineups:
BYU: Xojian Harry, Kylie Maeda, Lexi Eaton, Makenzi Morrison, Morgan Bailey
Santa Clara: Taylor Berry, Nici Gilday, Marie Bertholdt, Courtney Lisowski, Raquel Avila

Pepperdine
Broadcaster: Spencer Linton & Kristen Kozlowski
Series History: BYU leads series 9-2
Starting Lineups:
Pepperdine: Bria Richardson, Ea Shoushtari, Allie Green, Olivia Ogwumike, Keitra Wallace
BYU: Xojian Harry, Kylie Maeda, Lexi Eaton, Makenzi Morrison, Morgan Bailey

Loyola Marymount
Broadcasters: Robbie Bullough & Keilani Unga
Series History: BYU leads series 9-1
Starting Lineups:
LMU: Emily Ben-Jumbo, Sophie Taylor, Olivia Lucero, Leslie Lopez-Wood, Makenzie Cast
BYU: Xojian Harry, Kylie Maeda, Lexi Eaton, Makenzi Morrison, Morgan Bailey

Saint Mary's
Broadcaster: Elias Feldman
Series History: Series even 4-4
Starting Lineups:
BYU: Xojian Harry, Kylie Maeda, Lexi Eaton, Makenzi Morrison, Morgan Bailey
Saint Mary's: Lauren Nicholson, Hayley Hendricksen, Shannon Mauldin, Stella Beck, Carli Rosenthal

Pacific
Broadcaster: Don Gubbins
Series History: BYU leads series 8-2
Starting Lineups:
BYU: Xojian Harry, Kylie Maeda, Lexi Eaton, Makenzi Morrison, Morgan Bailey
Pacific: Kristina Johnson, Kendall Kenyon, Madison Parrish, Erin Butler, Hailie Eackles

San Diego
Broadcasters: Paula Bott & Susie Erpelding-Barosso
Series History: BYU leads series 8-1
Starting Lineups:
BYU: Xojian Harry, Kylie Maeda, Lexi Eaton, Makenzi Morrison, Morgan Bailey
San Diego: Malina Hood, Katelyn McDaniel, Sophia Ederaine, Maya Hood, Cori Woodward

Portland
Broadcaster: Spencer Linton, Kristen Kozlowski, & Andy Boyce
Series History: BYU leads series 15-4
Starting Lineups:
Portland: Kaylie Van Loo, Cassandra Brown, Kari Luttinen, Cassandra Thompson, Jasmine Wooton
BYU: Xojian Harry, Kylie Maeda, Lexi Eaton, Makenzi Morrison, Morgan Bailey

Gonzaga
Broadcasters: Dave McCann & Kristen Kozlowski
Series History: Gonzaga leads series 10-6
Starting Lineups:
Gonzaga: Georgia Stirton, Sunny Greinacher, Keani Albanez, Elle Tinkle, Shelby Cheslek
BYU: Ashley Garfield, Kylie Maeda, Lexi Eaton, Makenzi Morrison, Morgan Bailey

WCC Quarter: Saint Mary's
Broadcasters: Dave McCann & Blaine Fowler
Series History: Saint Mary's leads series 5-4
Starting Lineups:
BYU: Xojian Harry, Kylie Maeda, Lexi Eaton, Makenzi Morrison, Morgan Bailey
Saint Mary's: Lauren Nicholson, Hayley Hendricksen, Shannon Mauldin, Stella Beck, Carli Rosenthal

WCC Semi: Gonzaga
Broadcasters: Dave McCann & Blaine Fowler
Series History: Gonzaga leads series 11-6
Starting Lineups:
BYU: Xojian Harry, Kylie Maeda, Lexi Eaton, Makenzi Morrison, Morgan Bailey
Gonzaga: Georgia Stirton, Sunny Greinacher, Keani Albanez, Elle Tinkle, Shelby Cheslek

WCC Championship: San Francisco
Broadcasters: Beth Mowins & Katie Smith
Series History: BYU leads series 12-2
Starting Lineups:
San Francisco: Zhane Dikes, Taj Winston, Paige Spietz, Aundrea Gordon, Taylor Proctor
BYU: Xojian Harry, Kylie Maeda, Lexi Eaton, Makenzi Morrison, Morgan Bailey

NCAA 64: Louisville
Broadcasters: Bob Picozzi & Brooke Weisbrod
Series History: Louisville leads series 1-0
Starting Lineups:
BYU: Xojian Harry, Kylie Maeda, Lexi Eaton, Makenzi Morrison, Morgan Bailey
Louisville: Myisha Hines-Allen, Jude Schimmel, Mariya Moore, Sara Hammond, Sheronne Vails

Rankings

See also
BYU Cougars women's basketball

References

BYU Cougars women's basketball seasons
BYU
BYU
BYU Cougars
BYU Cougars